Ferdinand Katipana (born 19 September 1980) is a Dutch footballer who plays as a midfielder for DOVO in the Dutch Hoofdklasse.

Career
Born in Amersfoort, Katipana played with the youth teams of a number of Dutch clubs, including Jong Ajax and FC Utrecht. He played professionally between 2002 and 2008 for SC Cambuur and HFC Haarlem, scoring 12 goals in 154 appearances. He moved to current club IJsselmeervogels in 2008.

References

1980 births
Living people
Dutch footballers
Eredivisie players
Eerste Divisie players
Derde Divisie players
SC Cambuur players
Sportspeople from Amersfoort
VV DOVO players
FC Lienden players
Association football midfielders
Footballers from Utrecht (province)
AFC Ajax players
FC Utrecht players